Daniels Run is a  long 3rd order tributary to Tenmile Creek in Washington County, Pennsylvania.

Variant names
According to the Geographic Names Information System, it has also been known historically as: 
 Daniel Run

Course
Daniels Run rises about 0.5 miles south of Glyde, Pennsylvania, and then flows south to join Tenmile Creek at West Zollarsville.

Watershed
Daniels Run drains  of area, receives about 40.3 in/year of precipitation, has a wetness index of 311.05 and is about 65% forested.

See also
List of rivers of Pennsylvania

References

Rivers of Pennsylvania
Rivers of Washington County, Pennsylvania
Allegheny Plateau